Alexander Township is one of the fourteen townships of Athens County, Ohio, United States. The 2010 census found 2,811 people in the township.

Geography
Located in the southwestern part of the county, it borders the following townships:
Athens Township - north
Canaan Township - northeast corner
Lodi Township - east
Bedford Township, Meigs County - southeast corner
Scipio Township, Meigs County - south
Columbia Township, Meigs County - southwest corner
Lee Township - west
Waterloo Township - northwest corner

A small part of the village of Albany is located in southwestern Alexander Township. Alexander Township contains the unincorporated community of Pleasanton.

Name and history
It is the only Alexander Township statewide.

Government
The township is governed by a three-member board of trustees, who are elected in November of odd-numbered years to a four-year term beginning on the following January 1. Two are elected in the year after the presidential election and one is elected in the year before it. There is also an elected township fiscal officer, who serves a four-year term beginning on April 1 of the year after the election, which is held in November of the year before the presidential election. Vacancies in the fiscal officership or on the board of trustees are filled by the remaining trustees.

References

External links
County website

Townships in Athens County, Ohio
Townships in Ohio